"" is the corrected Latin phrase for the graffito "" from a scene in the film Monty Python's Life of Brian.

Life of Brian

The scene features John Cleese as a centurion and Graham Chapman as Brian, at that stage a would-be member of the revolutionary group the "People's Front of Judea". To prove himself worthy to be a member of the group, Brian has to daub the anti-Roman slogan "Romans go home" on the walls of Governor Pontius Pilate's palace in Jerusalem, under cover of darkness, written in Latin for the Romans to read.

He completes the phrase  when he is caught by a centurion. Brian is terrified and clearly expects to be killed on the spot. Instead, the centurion corrects Brian's grammatical mistakes in the manner of a traditional strict Latin teacher, as he has written "People called 'Romanes' they go the house". He forces Brian to use the proper imperative verb form and accusative case and write the correct phrase, 100 times, threatening to "cut [his] balls off" if he has not done so by sunrise. Brian does so, covering nearly every surface of the plaza with the graffiti watched by two guards. When he finishes the task in the following morning, one soldier says "don't do it again" and leaves with his comrade. Just as they leave, three other soldiers come round the corner and see the graffiti. Brian realises his position and races off, chased by the soldiers. In subsequent scenes, various Roman soldiers can be seen erasing the seditious graffiti.

Case of domus
The exchange on the case of domus concludes:

The (allative) case construction used in the final formulation is not locative but accusative of motion towards. The locative of domus in literary classical Latin is domi. The locative case (without the preposition in) was only used for the names of cities, small islands and a few other words. Correspondingly for these places and the word domus, the accusative was used without a preposition (in or ad) to indicate a motion towards.

References

External links
 "Graffiti vandal strikes in Gloucester", BBC News, 11 June 2003

Monty Python sketches
Latin words and phrases